Đoàn Thị Điểm (1705 - 1748), courtesy name Thụy Châu (瑞珠), pseudonym Mai Khuê (梅閨) or Rosy Clouds Lady (紅霞女士), was the classical-Vietnamese female poet.

Biography
Đoàn Thị Điểm was born in 1705 at Giai Phạm village, Văn Giang district, Kinh Bắc local government (now Yên Mỹ District, Hưng Yên province). She is best known for her biography of the goddess Liễu Hạnh and her version of Đặng Trần Côn's poem Lament of a soldier's wife from Hán into vernacular Nôm. The Lament is an example of double seven, six eight form. She was also believed to have posthumously written Nữ Trung Tùng Phận (Duties of Women), a Caodaist moral poem targeting women, in 1933

Family
 Đoàn Doãn Nghi (1678 - 1729) : Father
 Đoàn Doãn Luân (1700 - 1735) : Older brother.
 Nguyễn Kiều (1695 - 1752) : Husband (m. 1742-1748, her death).

See also
 Cai Yan
 Shin Saimdang
 Heo Chohui

References

1705 births
1748 deaths
People from Hưng Yên Province
People of Revival Lê dynasty
18th-century Vietnamese poets
Vietnamese ladies-in-waiting
18th-century Vietnamese women
Lê dynasty poets